The U.S. state of West Virginia first required its residents to register their motor vehicles and display license plates in 1905. , plates are issued by the West Virginia Department of Transportation through its Division of Motor Vehicles. Only rear plates have been required since 1944.

Passenger baseplates

1905 to 1970
The 1956–57 (dated 1957) issue was the first West Virginia license plate that complied with these standards.

1970 to present

Optional plates

References

External links
West Virginia license plates, 1969–present

West Virginia
West Virginia transportation-related lists
Transportation in West Virginia